Ludwig Gassner is an Austrian luger who competed in the early 1960s. He won a bronze medal in the men's doubles event at the 1962 FIL European Luge Championships in Weissenbach, Austria.

References
List of European luge champions 

Austrian male lugers
Possibly living people
Year of birth missing